Beinn Bhrotain (Scottish Gaelic: Hill of the mastiff) or Ben Vrottan is a Scottish mountain in the Cairngorms range, 18 kilometres west of Braemar in the county of Aberdeenshire.

See also 
 Ben Nevis
 List of Munro mountains
 Mountains and hills of Scotland

References

Munros
Marilyns of Scotland
Mountains and hills of the Cairngorms
Mountains and hills of Aberdeenshire
Places and place names on Mar Lodge Estate
One-thousanders of Scotland